The Sand Canyon Formation is a geologic formation in Nebraska. It preserves fossils dating back to the Neogene period.

See also

 List of fossiliferous stratigraphic units in Nebraska
 Paleontology in Nebraska

References
 

Neogene geology of Nebraska